Lewis Brunt (born 6 November 2000) is an English professional footballer who plays for Premier League club Leicester City as a defender. Brunt is a product of the Aston Villa Academy and also played for Gloucester City on loan twice between 2020 and 2021.

Club career

Aston Villa
Brunt started his career at Aston Villa. After playing for the Under-18s and Under-23s, he was given his first professional contract by Villa in November 2018. On 23 January 2020, Brunt signed for National League North side Gloucester City on loan. On 4 June 2021, Aston Villa announced that Brunt had not been offered a new contract at the end of his existing deal.

Leicester City
In August 2021, Brunt signed for Leicester City. He made his first team debut on 8 January 2022 against Watford in the FA Cup. On 1 May 2022, Brunt made his Premier League debut, coming on as a 67th minute substitute for Boubakary Soumaré in a 3-1 away defeat to Tottenham Hotspur.

Brunt won Men's Development Squad Player of the Season for the 2021-22 season. In August 2022, he signed a new three-year contract with the club.

Career statistics

References

Living people
2000 births
English footballers
Association football defenders
Leicester City F.C. players
Aston Villa F.C. players
Gloucester City A.F.C. players
National League (English football) players
Premier League players